Aqeel Ahmed may refer to:

 Aqeel Ahmed (director) (born 1987), British film writer and director
 Aqeel Ahmed (cricketer) (born 1982), Pakistani cricketer
 Aqeel Ahmed (boxer) (born 1992), British boxer
 Aqeel Ahmed (colonel) (born 1965), Pakistani colonel